Nina Katarina Ehrnrooth (born 9 April 1962 in Helsinki) is a retired Finnish alpine skier who competed in the 1988 Winter Olympics.

External links
 sports-reference.com
 

1962 births
Living people
Finnish female alpine skiers
Olympic alpine skiers of Finland
Alpine skiers at the 1988 Winter Olympics
Sportspeople from Helsinki
20th-century Finnish women